Pterolocera leucocera is a species of moth of the Anthelidae family. It is found in New South Wales, Victoria and Tasmania.

The wingspan is about 50 mm for males. The females are unable to fly.

References

Anthelidae
Moths of Australia
Moths described in 1921